The oat (Avena sativa), sometimes called the common oat, is a species of cereal grain grown for its seed, which is known by the same name (usually in the plural, unlike other cereals and pseudocereals). While oats are suitable for human consumption as oatmeal and rolled oats, one of the most common uses is as livestock feed. Oats are a nutrient-rich food associated with lower blood cholesterol when consumed regularly.

Avenins are oat gluten proteins, similar to gliadin in wheat. They can trigger celiac disease in a small proportion of people. Also, oat products are frequently contaminated by other gluten-containing grains, mainly wheat and barley.

Origin
The wild ancestor of Avena sativa and the closely related minor crop  A. byzantina  is A. sterilis. A. sterilis is a wild oat that is naturally hexaploid. Genetic evidence shows the ancestral forms of A. sterilis grew in the Fertile Crescent of the Near East. Oats are usually thought to have emerged as a secondary crop, i.e., derived from a weed of the primary cereal domesticates, then spreading westward into cooler, wetter areas favorable for oats, eventually leading to their domestication in regions of the Middle East and Europe.

Cultivation

Oats are best grown in temperate regions. They have a lower summer heat requirement and greater tolerance of rain than other cereals, such as wheat, rye or barley, so they are particularly important in areas with cool, wet summers, such as Northwest Europe and even Iceland. Oats are an annual plant, and can be planted either in autumn/fall (for late summer harvest) or in the spring (for early autumn/fall harvest).

Production
Production was led by Russia with 21% of the total and Canada with 14% (table).

Uses

Oats have numerous uses in foods; most commonly, they are rolled or crushed into oatmeal, or ground into fine oat flour. Oatmeal is chiefly eaten as porridge, but may also be used in a variety of baked goods, such as oatcakes, oatmeal cookies and oat bread. Oats are also an ingredient in many cold cereals, in particular muesli and granola. Oats are also used for production of milk substitutes ("oat milk").

Historical attitudes towards oats have varied. Oat bread was first manufactured in Britain, where the first oat bread factory was established in 1899. In Scotland, they were, and still are, held in high esteem, as a mainstay of the national diet.

In Scotland, a dish was made by soaking the husks from oats for a week, so the fine, floury part of the meal remained as sediment to be strained off, boiled and eaten. Oats are also widely used there as a thickener in soups, as barley or rice might be used in other countries.

Oats are also commonly used as feed for horses when extra carbohydrates and the subsequent boost in energy are required. The oat hull may be crushed ("rolled" or "crimped") for the horse to more easily digest the grain, or may be fed whole. They may be given alone or as part of a blended food pellet. Cattle are also fed oats, either whole or ground into a coarse flour using a roller mill, burr mill, or hammermill. Oat forage is commonly used to feed all kinds of ruminants, as pasture, straw, hay or silage.

Winter oats may be grown as an off-season groundcover and ploughed under in the spring as a green fertilizer, or harvested in early summer. They also can be used for pasture; they can be grazed a while, then allowed to head out for grain production, or grazed continuously until other pastures are ready.

Oat straw is prized by cattle and horse producers as bedding, due to its soft, relatively dust-free, and absorbent nature. The straw can also be used for making corn dollies. Tied in a muslin bag, oat straw was used to soften bath water.

Oats are also occasionally used in several different drinks. In Britain, they are sometimes used for brewing beer. Oatmeal stout is one variety brewed using a percentage of oats for the wort. The more rarely used oat malt is produced by the Thomas Fawcett & Sons Maltings and was used in the Maclay Oat Malt Stout before Maclays Brewery ceased independent brewing operations. A cold, sweet drink called avena made of ground oats and milk is a popular refreshment throughout Latin America. Oatmeal caudle, made of ale and oatmeal with spices, was a traditional British drink and a favourite of Oliver Cromwell.

Oat extracts can also be used to soothe skin conditions, and are popular for their emollient properties in cosmetics.

Oat grass has been used traditionally for medicinal purposes, including to help balance the menstrual cycle, treat dysmenorrhoea and for osteoporosis and urinary tract infections.

Health

Nutrient profile

Oats contain diverse essential nutrients (table). In a 100 gram serving, oats provide  and are a rich source (20% or more of the Daily Value, DV) of protein (34% DV), dietary fiber (44% DV), several B vitamins and numerous dietary minerals, especially manganese (233% DV) (table). Oats are 66% carbohydrates, including 11% dietary fiber and 4% beta-glucans, 7% fat and 17% protein (table).

The established property of their cholesterol-lowering effects has led to acceptance of oats as a health food.

Soluble fiber
Oat bran is the outer casing of the oat. Its daily consumption over weeks lowers LDL and total cholesterol, possibly reducing the risk of heart disease.

One type of soluble fiber, beta-glucans, has been proven to lower cholesterol.

After reports of research finding that dietary oats can help lower cholesterol, the United States Food and Drug Administration (FDA) issued a final rule that allows food companies to make health claims on food labels of foods that contain soluble fiber from whole oats (oat bran, oat flour and rolled oats), noting that 3.0 grams of soluble fiber daily from these foods may reduce the risk of heart disease. To qualify for the health claim, the food that contains the oats must provide at least 0.75 grams of soluble fiber per serving.

Beta-D-glucans, usually referred to as beta-glucans, comprise a class of indigestible polysaccharides widely found in nature in sources such as grains, barley, yeast, bacteria, algae and mushrooms. In oats, barley and other cereal grains, they are located primarily in the endosperms cell wall. The oat beta-glucan health claim applies to oat bran, rolled oats, whole oat flour and oatrim, a soluble fraction of alpha-amylase from hydrolyzed oat bran or whole oat flour.

Oat beta-glucan is a viscous polysaccharide made up of units of the monosaccharide D-glucose. Oat beta-glucan is composed of mixed-linkage polysaccharides. This means the bonds between the D-glucose or D-glucopyranosyl units are either beta-1, 3 linkages or beta-1, 4 linkages. This type of beta-glucan is also referred to as a mixed-linkage (1→3), (1→4)-beta-D-glucan. The (1→3)-linkages break up the uniform structure of the beta-D-glucan molecule and make it soluble and flexible. In comparison, the indigestible polysaccharide cellulose is also a beta-glucan, but is not soluble because of its (1→4)-beta-D-linkages. The percentages of beta-glucan in the various whole oat products are: oat bran, having from 5.5% to 23.0%; rolled oats, about 4%; and whole oat flour about 4%.

Fat 
Oats, after corn (maize), have the highest lipid content of any cereal, i.e. greater than 10% for oats and as high as 17% for some maize cultivars compared to about 2–3% for wheat and most other cereals. The polar lipid content of oats (about 8–17% glycolipid and 10–20% phospholipid or a total of about 33%) is greater than that of other cereals, since much of the lipid fraction is contained within the endosperm.

Protein

Oats are the only cereal containing a globulin or legume-like protein, avenalin, as the major (80%) storage protein. Globulins are characterised by solubility in dilute saline as opposed to the more typical cereal proteins, such as gluten and zein, the prolamines (prolamins). The minor protein of oat is a prolamine, avenin.

Oat protein is nearly equivalent in quality to soy protein, which World Health Organization research has shown to be equal to meat, milk and egg protein. The protein content of the hull-less oat kernel (groat) ranges from 12 to 24%, the highest among cereals.

Celiac disease

Celiac disease (coeliac disease) is a permanent autoimmune disease triggered by certain gluten proteins. It almost always occurs in genetically predisposed people, having a prevalence of about 1% in the developed world. The provocative gluten types are present in wheat, barley, rye, oat, and all their species and hybrids and contains hundreds of proteins, with high contents of prolamins.

Oat prolamins, named avenins, are similar to gliadins found in wheat, hordeins in barley, and secalins in rye. These are all types of glutens which are commonly called "gluten" in lay speech. Avenins' toxicity in celiac people depends on the oat cultivar consumed because of prolamin genes, protein amino acid sequences, and the immunoreactivities of toxic prolamins which vary among oat varieties. Also, oat products are frequently cross-contaminated with other gluten-containing cereals during grain harvesting, transport, storage or processing. Pure oats contain less than 20 parts per million of gluten from wheat, barley, rye, or any of their hybrids.

Use of pure oats in a gluten-free diet offers improved nutritional value from the rich content of oat protein, vitamins, minerals, fiber, and lipids, but remains controversial because a small proportion of people with celiac disease react to pure oats. Some cultivars of pure oat could be a safe part of a gluten-free diet, requiring knowledge of the oat variety used in food products for a gluten-free diet. Determining whether oat consumption is safe is critical because people with poorly controlled celiac disease may develop multiple severe health complications, including cancers.

Use of pure oat products is an option, with the assessment of a health professional, when the celiac person has been on a gluten-free diet for at least 6 months and all celiac symptoms have disappeared clinically. Celiac disease may relapse in few cases with the consumption of pure oats. Screening with serum antibodies for celiac disease is not sensitive enough to detect people who react to pure oats and the absence of digestive symptoms is not an accurate indicator of intestinal recovery because up to 50% of people with active celiac disease have no digestive symptoms. The lifelong follow-up of celiac people who choose to consume oats may require periodic performance of intestinal biopsies. The long-term effects of pure oats consumption are still unclear and further well-designed studies identifying the cultivars used are needed before making final recommendations for a gluten-free diet.

Agronomy

Oats are sown in the spring or early summer in colder areas, as soon as the soil can be worked. An early start is crucial to good fields, as oats go dormant in summer heat. In warmer areas, oats are sown in late summer or early fall. Oats are cold-tolerant and are unaffected by late frosts or snow.

Seeding rates
Lower rates are used when interseeding with a legume. Somewhat higher rates can be used on the best soils, or where there are problems with weeds. Excessive sowing rates lead to problems with lodging, and may reduce yields.

Fertilizer requirements
Oats remove substantial amounts of nitrogen from the soil. They also remove phosphorus in the form of P2O5 at the rate of 0.25 pound per bushel (1 bushel = 38 pounds at 12% moisture). Phosphate is thus applied at a rate of 30 to 40 kg/ha, or 30 to 40 lb/acre. Oats remove potash (K2O) at a rate of 0.19 pound per bushel, which causes it to use 15–30 kg/ha, or 13–27 lb/acre. Usually, 50–100 kg/ha (45–90 lb/ac) of nitrogen in the form of urea or anhydrous ammonia is sufficient, as oats use about one pound per bushel. A sufficient amount of nitrogen is particularly important for plant height and hence, straw quality and yield. When the prior-year crop was a legume, or where ample manure is applied, nitrogen rates can be reduced somewhat.

Weed control
The vigorous growth of oats tends to choke out most weeds. A few tall broadleaf weeds, such as ragweed, goosegrass, wild mustard, and buttonweed (velvetleaf), occasionally create a problem, as they complicate harvest and reduce yields. These can be controlled with a modest application of a broadleaf herbicide, such as 2,4-D, while the weeds are still small.

Pests and diseases

Oats are relatively free from diseases and pests. Nonetheless, it does suffer from some leaf diseases, such as Leaf Rust, Stem Rust (Puccinia graminis f. sp. avenae), and Crown Rust (P. coronata var. avenae).. Crown rust infection can greatly reduce photosynthesis and overall physiological activities of oat leaves, thereby reducing growth and crop yield. A few lepidopteran caterpillars feed on the plants—e.g. rustic shoulder-knot and setaceous Hebrew character moths, but these rarely become a major pest.

Harvesting

Harvest techniques are a matter of available equipment, local tradition, and priorities. Farmers seeking the highest yield from their crops time their harvest so the kernels have reached 35% moisture, or when the greenest kernels are just turning cream-colour. They leave the windrows to dry in the sun for several days before combining them using a pickup header. Finally, they bale the straw.

Oats can also be left standing until completely ripe and then combined with a grain head. This causes greater field losses as the grain falls from the heads, and to harvesting losses, as the grain is threshed out by the reel. Without a draper head, there is also more damage to the straw, since it is not properly oriented as it enters the combine's throat. Overall yield loss is 10–15% compared to proper swathing.

Historical harvest methods involved cutting with a scythe or sickle, and threshing under the feet of cattle. Late 19th- and early 20th-century harvesting was performed using a binder. Oats were gathered into shocks, and then collected and run through a stationary threshing machine.

Storage
After combining, the oats are transported to the farmyard using a grain truck, semi, or road train, where they are augered or conveyed into a bin for storage. Sometimes, when there is not enough bin space, they are augered into portable grain rings, or piled on the ground. Oats can be safely stored at 12-14% moisture; at higher moisture levels, they must be aerated or dried.

Yield and quality

In the United States, No.1 oats weigh ; No. 2 oats must weigh . No.3 oats must weigh at least . If , they are graded as No.4, and oats under  are graded as "light weight".

In Canada, No.1 oats weigh ; No.2 oats must weigh ; No.3 oats must weigh at least  and if oats are lighter than  they do not make No.4 oats and have no grade.

Genome 
Avena sativa is an allohexaploid species with three ancestral genomes (2n = 6x = 42; AACCDD). As a result, the genome is large (12.6 Gb, 1C-value = 12.85) and complex. Cultivated hexaploid oat has a unique mosaic chromosome architecture that is the result of numerous translocations between the three subgenomes. These translocations may cause breeding barriers and incompatibilities when crossing varieties with different chromosomal architecture. Hence, oat breeding and the crossing of desired traits has been hampered by the lack of a reference genome assembly. In May 2022, a fully annotated reference genome sequence of Avena sativa was reported. The AA subgenome is presumed to be derived from A. longiglumis and the CCDD from the tetraploid A. insularis.

Genetics and breeding 
Species within Avena can hybridize and genes introgressed from other "A" genome species has contributed with many valuable traits, like oat crown rust (Puccinia coronata f. sp. avenae) resistance.  is one such trait, introgressed from A. sterilis CAV 1979, conferring all stage resistance (ASR) against Pca.

It is also possible to do introgression of traits in oats from very wide intergeneric hybridization. In contrast to wheat, oats sometimes retain chromosomes from maize or pearl millet. These wide crosses are typically made in order to generate doubled haploid breeding material where the rapid loss of the alien chromosomes from the unrelated pollen donor results in a plant with only a single set of chromosomes (a haploid).
The addition lines with alien chromosomes can be used as a source for novel traits in oats, for example, research on Oat-Maize-Addition lines (OMAs) has been used to map genes involved in C4 photosynthesis. In order to obtain mendelian inheritance of these novel traits, radiation hybrid lines have also been established, where maize chromosome segments have been introgressed into the oat genome. Interestingly, this technique  which potentially transfer thousands of genes from a species that is very distantly related  is not considered a GMO technique according to the European Union definition, since sexual hybridization and radiation-induced introgression are explicitly excluded from the definition.

Processing

Oats processing is a relatively simple process:

Cleaning and sizing
Upon delivery to the milling plant, chaff, rocks, metal, oversized materials and foreign grains are removed from the oats. As different sized oats de-hull at differing velocities, once the raw oats have been removed of impurities, they are then separated by width and length into different classifications before de-hulling.

Dehulling
Centrifugal acceleration is used to separate the outer hull from the inner oat groat. Oats are fed by gravity onto the centre of a horizontally spinning impeller, which accelerates them towards an outer mill ring. Groats and hulls are separated on impact. The lighter oat hulls are then aspirated away, while the denser oat groats are taken to the next step of processing. Oat hulls can be used as feed or as a biomass fuel and are often used within the oat processing line to power solid fuel boilers for steam and power generation. Excess oat hulls are generally pelletised before being provided as feed.

Kilning
The unsized oat groats pass through a heat and moisture treatment to balance moisture for optimal storage conditions and to deactivate self catalysing enzyme activity. Oat groats are high in fat (lipids) and once removed from their protective hulls and exposed to air, enzymatic (lipase) activity begins to break down the fat into free fatty acids, ultimately causing an off-flavour or rancidity. Depending on temperature, humidity and moisture content, de-hulled oats can begin to show signs of enzymatic rancidity rapidly if not stabilized. This process is primarily done in food-grade plants, not in feed-grade plants. Groats are not considered raw if they have gone through this process; the heat disrupts the germ and they cannot sprout.

Sizing of groats
Some whole oat groats break during the de-hulling process so additional processing of the groats is required. Groats are sized again and separated by length and width using shaker screens and indent cylinders until uniform product streams are generated. Modern oat milling technologies also sort impurities by colour with colour sorting machines or more traditionally, on specific gravity with paddy tables or gravity table separators. A final grade of whole oat groats should have minimal oat hulls, other seeds or broken groats.

When the whole oat groats are to be flaked for use in porridge, the whole groats are passed through a groat cutter machine to create uniform pieces of cut groats for quick or instant style porridge whereas traditional style porridge is flaked from whole groats.

The small percentage of broken groats generated throughout the de-hulling process are also utilised in various other products or even in flaking for porridge.

Final processing
Three methods are used to make the finished product:

Flaking
This process uses two smooth cylinders rotating at a controlled distance, before which the cut groats are conditioned and then passed through the cylinders for flaking. Conditioning of the groats for flaking ensures production of stable and consistent flakes with minimal crumbling and is done by adding moisture and heat to the groats with sufficient retention time prior to flaking.
Oat flake thickness is a key control point dependant of the type of oat flakes to be produced which typically range from around half a millimetre for quick or instant style porridge and up to around 1mm for traditional style porridge.
After flaking, the oats are then dried to a sufficient moisture for storage and transport.

Oat bran milling
This process takes the oat groats through several roll stands to flatten and separate the bran from the flour (endosperm). The two separate products (flour and bran) get sifted through a gyrating sifter screen to further separate them. The final products are oat bran and debranned oat flour.

Whole flour milling
This process takes oat groats straight to a grinding unit (stone or hammer mill) and then over sifter screens to separate the coarse flour and final whole oat flour. The coarser flour is sent back to the grinding unit until it is ground fine enough to be whole oat flour. This method is used often in India and other countries. In India, whole grain oat flour (jai) is used to make Indian bread known as jarobra in Himachal Pradesh.

Preparation at home
Oat flour can be ground for small scale use by pulsing rolled oats or old-fashioned (not quick) oats in a food processor or spice mill.

Oats futures

Oats futures are traded on the Chicago Board of Trade and have delivery dates in March (H), May (K), July (N), September (U) and December (Z).

See also

Oat products and derivatives

 Export hay
 Muesli
 Oat bread
 Oat milk
 Oatcake
 Oatmeal
 Parkin (cake)
 Porridge
 Rolled oats
 Steel-cut oats

Major oat businesses
Jordans (company)
Mornflake
Quaker Oats Company

References

External links 

 
Avena
Cereals
Demulcents
Fodder
Medicinal plants
Plants described in 1753
Staple foods